Rule the World may refer to:

Music
Rule the World: The Greatest Hits, an album by Tears for Fears, 2017
"Rule the World" (2 Chainz song), 2019
"Rule the World" (Take That song), 2007
"Rule the World" (The Wanted song), 2021
"Rule the World", a song by Christina Grimmie and Ryan Brown, 2022
"Rule the World", a song by Kamelot from Ghost Opera, 2007
"Rule the World", a song by Walk off the Earth from Sing It All Away, 2015

Other uses
Rule the World (horse) (foaled 2007), a Thoroughbred racehorse
Rule the World (TV series), a 2017 Chinese TV series

See also
"Everybody Wants to Rule the World", a 1985 song by Tears for Fears
Ruler of the World (foaled 2010), a Thoroughbred racehorse
World domination, a concept of conquest of the world
World government, a concept of a single global government